William Daryl Hine (February 24, 1936 – August 20, 2012) was a Canadian poet and translator.  A MacArthur Fellow for the class of 1986, Hine was the editor of Poetry from 1968 to 1978. He graduated from McGill University in 1958 and then studied in Europe, as a Canada Council scholar.  He earned a PhD. in comparative literature at the University of Chicago (UChicago) in 1967.  During his career, Hine taught at UChicago, the University of Illinois at Chicago, and Northwestern University.

Life

Hine was born in Burnaby in 1936 and grew up in New Westminster, British Columbia. He was the adopted son of Robert Fraser and Elsie James Hine. He attended McGill University in Montreal 1954–58. His first chapbook, The Carnal and the Crane, was published as part of Louis Dudek's McGill Poetry Series in 1957.

Hine then went to Europe on a Canada Council scholarship, where he lived for the next three years. He moved to New York in 1962 and to Chicago in 1963, taking a PhD in Comparative Literature at the University of Chicago in 1967. He taught there and at Northwestern University and at University of Illinois (Chicago campus) during the following decades, while he served as an editor.  Editor of Poetry magazine, from 1968 to 1978, his correspondence from that time is held at Indiana University. He was awarded a MacArthur Fellowship in 1986.

Hine's work appeared in the New York Review of Books, Harper's, The New Yorker, The Tamarack Review, The Paris Review.

The poet first came out as gay in his 1975 work In & Out, which was initially available only in a privately printed version in limited circulation. The work did not gain general publication until 1989.

Following the death of his partner of more than 30 years, the philosopher Samuel Todes, Hine lived in semi-retirement in Evanston, Illinois.  Hine died of complications of a blood disorder on August 20, 2012, at the age of 76.

Awards
 2005 Harold Morton Landon Translation Award
 1986 MacArthur Foundation Fellow
 1980 Guggenheim Fellowship

Works
   (novel)
  (nonfiction)

Poetry

 
 
 
 
 
 
 
   (privately printed, 1975)
 
  {Atheneum, 1981}
 
 
  (Knopf (New York, NY), 1991)

Plays
 A Mutual Flame (radio play), BBC, 1961.
 The Death of Seneca, produced in Chicago, 1968.
 Alcestis (radio play), BBC, 1972.

Translations
 
 
 (And author of commentary) Theocritus: Idylls and Epigrams, Atheneum, 1982.

References

External links
 "Dictionary of Literary Biography on (William) Daryl Hine"
 "Daryl Hine" Poetry Foundation

1936 births
2012 deaths
20th-century Canadian poets
Canadian male poets
21st-century Canadian poets
Formalist poets
University of Chicago faculty
People from New Westminster
People from Burnaby
Writers from British Columbia
Canadian gay writers
MacArthur Fellows
Canadian LGBT poets
McGill University alumni
University of Chicago alumni
20th-century Canadian male writers
21st-century Canadian male writers
21st-century Canadian LGBT people
Gay poets